A by-election was held for the New South Wales Legislative Assembly electorate of Barwon on 16 November 1940 following the resignation of Ben Wade, to contest the federal seat of Gwydir at the 1940 election, however he was unsuccessful.

Dates

Results

|- style="background-color:#E9E9E9"
! colspan="6" style="text-align:left;" |After distribution of preferences

Ben Wade resigned to unsuccessfully contest the 1940 election for Gwydir. Preferences were not distributed to completion.

See also
Electoral results for the district of Barwon
List of New South Wales state by-elections

References

1940 elections in Australia
New South Wales state by-elections
1940s in New South Wales